South Africa competed at the 2017 World Aquatics Championships in Budapest, Hungary from 14 to 30 July 2017.

Medalists

Diving

South Africa has entered 4 divers (four female).

Women

Open water swimming

South Africa has entered six open water swimmers

Swimming

South African swimmers have achieved qualifying standards in the following events (up to a maximum of 2 swimmers in each event at the A-standard entry time, and 1 at the B-standard):

Men

Women

Mixed

Synchronized swimming

South Africa's synchronized swimming team consisted of 10 athletes (10 female).

Women

 Legend: (R) = Reserve Athlete

Water polo

South Africa qualified both a men's and women's teams.

Men's tournament

Team roster

Julian Lewis
Etienne le Roux
Devon Card
Nardus Badenhorst
Chris Brown
Jon de Carvalho
Lood Radie
Nicholas Rodda
Dean Whyte
Pierre le Roux (C)
Nicholas Molyneux
Roarke Olver
Themba Mthembu

Group play

13th–16th place semifinals

15th place game

Women's tournament

Team roster

Rebecca Thomas
Amber Penney
Kieren Paley
Shelley Faulmann
Megan Schooling (C)
Amica Hallendorff
Carly Wessels
Amy Keevy
Zandre Smit
Marcelle Manson
Nicola Barrett
Kelsey White (C)
Lauren Nixon

Group play

13th–16th place semifinals

15th place game

References

Nations at the 2017 World Aquatics Championships
2017
World Aquatics Championships